The Sexual Offences Act 2006 refers to Legislation passed in Kenya to a rise in cases of sexual violence.  The law was moved by then nominated member of Parliament  Njoki Susanna Ndung'u.

Purpose of the Act
The aim of the Sexual Offences Act is to explain sexual offences and make ways for prevention and protection of all persons from illegal
sexual acts.

See also
 Njoki Susanna Ndung'u
 National Assembly of Kenya
 Constitution of Kenya

References

Law of Kenya